Wetlands is a 2011 Canadian film from Quebec written and directed by Guy Édoin and starring Pascale Bussières, Gabriel Maillé, Luc Picard and François Papineau. It had its Canadian premier at the Toronto International Film Festival and its Quebec premier at the Festival de Cinéma de la Ville de Québec (FCVQ). Theatrical release was on October 14, 2011.

Plot
During a drought, conflict disrupts the life of the Santerre family on a dairy farm in Quebec's Eastern Townships.  By confronting themselves, they learn to forgive.

Cast
Pascale Bussières as Marie
Gabriel Maillé as Simon
Luc Picard as Jean
François Papineau as Pierre
Angèle Coutu as Therese
Denise Dubois as Rejeanne
Julien Lemire as a young farmer
Michel Perron as a well-digger (father)
Guillaume Cyr as a well-digger (son)
Valérie Blain as danser

Awards / Nominations
2011: Nominated for "Best First Film" at the Mostra Venice Film Festival
2011: Nominated for "KINO Audience Award – International Film Critics' Week" at the Mostra Venice Film Festival
2012: Nominated for the Prix collégial du cinéma québécois

References

External links
 
 

2011 films
Films directed by Guy Édoin
Canadian drama films
Canadian LGBT-related films
2011 LGBT-related films
LGBT-related drama films
2010s French-language films
French-language Canadian films
2010s Canadian films